Acrocercops demotes is a moth of the family Gracillariidae, known from Mexico. It was described by Walsingham, Lord Thomas de Grey, in 1914.

References

demotes
Moths of Central America
Moths described in 1914